Tan Qilong (3 January 1913 – 22 January 2003) was a politician in the People's Republic of China. Over his long career, he served as the Communist Party Chief, the top government official, of four different provinces: Zhejiang (twice), Shandong, Qinghai, and Sichuan. He also served as Governor of Zhejiang, Shandong, and Qinghai.

Tan was born in Yongxin County, Jiangxi province on 3 January 1913 and joined the Chinese Communist Party in 1933. He was persecuted during the Cultural Revolution but was rehabilitated in 1970 and served in Fujian province. He died on 22 January 2003 in Jinan, Shandong.

References

1913 births
2003 deaths
Governors of Zhejiang
Governors of Shandong
Governors of Qinghai
Political office-holders in Sichuan
Political office-holders in Fujian
Chinese Communist Party politicians from Jiangxi
People's Republic of China politicians from Jiangxi
Politicians from Ji'an
Alternate members of the 9th Central Committee of the Chinese Communist Party
People of the Republic of China
Victims of the Cultural Revolution